The 1951–52 season was the 59th season in Liverpool F.C.'s existence, and the club finished eleventh in the table.

In the FA Cup, a ground record of 61,905 watched the fourth round FA Cup match versus Wolverhampton Wanderers. The club was eliminated from the FA Cup in the following round after losing to Burnley.

Goalkeepers

 Charlie Ashcroft
 Russell Crossley

Defenders

 Joe Cadden
 John Heydon
 Laurie Hughes
 Bill Jones
 Ray Lambert
 Bob Paisley
 Steve Parr
 Bill Shepherd
 Eddie Spicer
 Phil Taylor
 George Whitworth

Midfielders

 Ken Brierley
 Brian Jackson
 Billy Liddell
 Jimmy Payne
 Jack Smith
 Bryan Williams
 Don Woan

Forwards

 Jack Balmer
 Kevin Baron
 Louis Bimpson
 Cyril Done
 Willie Fagan
 Jack Haigh
 Mervyn Jones
 Albert Stubbins

Table

Results

First Division

FA Cup

References
 LFC History.net – 1951–52 season
 Liverweb - 1951–52 Season

Liverpool F.C. seasons
Liverpool